Some Hearts is the debut studio album by American singer and songwriter Carrie Underwood, released in the United States on November 15, 2005, by Arista Nashville. The album contains the number one country singles "Jesus, Take the Wheel", "Don't Forget to Remember Me", "Wasted", and "Before He Cheats". The North American version contains the Billboard Hot 100 number one single, "Inside Your Heaven", as a bonus track.

Bolstered by the success of its singles, Some Hearts became the best-selling album of 2006 across all genres in the United States. The album was also the best-selling country album in the United States of both 2006 and 2007, making Underwood the first female artist in Billboard history to earn back-to-back honors for Top Country Album. Additionally, it was the best-selling female country album of 2005, 2006 and 2007. Some Hearts has since been certified 9× platinum  by the Recording Industry Association of America (RIAA), and is the fastest-selling debut country album in the history of the Nielsen SoundScan era, the best-selling solo female debut album in country music history, the best-selling country album of the last 10 years, and the best-selling album by an American Idol alumni in the U.S.

It was listed as one of the 100 best-selling albums of all time by the RIAA in 2009. Some Hearts has since sold over 7.45 million copies in the U.S. and over ten million worldwide. In December 2009, Billboard announced that the album was the biggest-selling country album of the decade, as well as the fourteenth biggest-selling album of any genre.

The album and its songs were praised by music critics. It led Underwood to win three Grammy Awards: Best New Artist in 2007 and twice Best Female Country Vocal Performance—for "Jesus, Take the Wheel", in 2007, and for "Before He Cheats", in 2008. Additionally, Some Hearts won Album of the Year at the 2007 Academy of Country Music Awards, while "Jesus, Take the Wheel" and "Before He Cheats" both won Single of the Year at the 2006 Academy of Country Music Awards and 2007 Country Music Association Awards, respectively.

Background and Development
About the song "Jesus, Take the Wheel", co-writer Brett James said it was written at Hillary Lindsey's house, with the original title being "When Jesus Takes the Wheel", and that there was no specific artist in mind to record the song. In 2016, singer Hillary Scott said she was initially offered the song while Underwood was on American Idol. Following her Idol win, Underwood traveled back to her home in Oklahoma before heading again to  Los Angeles for the American Idols Live tour rehearsals. At the time, Underwood told People, "This is my time to see the world. Home will be there when I get back." She later bought her first home in the Nashville suburb of Franklin, TN in November 2005 before selling it in 2007. A Billboard article from October 2005 first announced the name of the debut album, but mentioned "I Ain't in Checotah Anymore" and "What Else You Got" as tracks, with the latter being cut from the finished record. Recording of the album took place in three months, while Underwood was touring, and she met with writers such as Hillary Lindsey and Rivers Rutherford at Karian Studios during a writing session.

Singles
Carrie Underwood's American Idol winning single "Inside Your Heaven", which debuted at number one on the Billboard Hot 100 five months before the release of Some Hearts, is included on the album as a bonus track. The song is Underwood's only number 1 on the Hot 100. The song has sold 880,000 copies.

The first single from the album, "Jesus, Take the Wheel", was No. 1 on the U.S. Billboard Hot Country Songs chart for six consecutive weeks and reached No. 20 on the Billboard Hot 100. In August 2008, "Jesus, Take the Wheel" was reported to have been sold more than 1 million ringtones and was certified Platinum, the first achievement by a country artist for two  Platinum Mastertone ranked songs. As of February 2016, it has sold 2,473,000 copies in the United States and has been certified 3× Platinum by the RIAA.

"Some Hearts", written by Diane Warren and originally covered by Marshall Crenshaw in 1989, was released to pop and adult contemporary radio only and eventually reached number 12 on the Adult Contemporary chart. As of June 2011 it has sold 207,000 copies.

"Don't Forget to Remember Me" was the third single from the album, and also proved successful, reaching number one on the Mediabase Country Chart, number two on the Billboard Hot Country Songs chart, and number 49 on the Hot 100. The song has sold 403,000 copies in the United States and has been certified Gold by the RIAA as of August 12, 2013.

"Before He Cheats" was released as the next single, and climbed the charts faster than any of Underwood's other singles, making it into the top twenty of the Hot Country Songs chart before the release of a music video. "Before He Cheats" subsequently peaked at number one on the Hot Country Songs chart for five consecutive weeks, and at number eight on the Hot 100; it proved to be a huge crossover hit, making appearances in the top 20 of every chart on which it appeared, and it is the biggest hit overall from the album. When it finally peaked at number 8 in May 2007, it had already logged 38 weeks on the chart, making it the longest trek to the top 10 ever. As pop airplay began dying down, the song got a third life on the adult contemporary format, which began playing the song in May. "Before He Cheats" spent 64 consecutive weeks on the Hot 100, before finally falling off in late November 2007. The song is the fifth-longest charting single on the Hot 100, following LeAnn Rimes's "How Do I Live", Jewel's "You Were Meant for Me"/"Foolish Games", Adele's "Rolling in the Deep", and Jason Mraz's "I'm Yours". It is the second longest running hit so far this decade. "Before He Cheats" reached No. 6 on the 2007 Hot 100 Year-End Chart and fifth on the 2007 Hot 100 Airplay Year-End Chart by Billboard magazine. It reached No. 10 on the 2007 Adult Contemporary Year-End Chart. It was named the 2007 Single of the Year by the Country Music Association. It is Underwood's best selling single and had sold 4,312,000 digital downloads as of August 2016, making it the third best-selling country song of all time behind Lady Antebellum's "Need You Now", with 4.97 million and Taylor Swift's "Love Story", with 4.96 million. It is the third best-selling song by an American Idol contestant in the United States (behind Phillip Phillips' Home and Kelly Clarkson's "Stronger (What Doesn't Kill You)"), and the fourth longest-charting single in the history of the Hot 100. It also came in on CMT's 40 Greatest Songs of the Decade at number twenty-five, along with Underwood's other signature hit, "Jesus, Take the Wheel", it reached No. 4. It has been certified 7× Platinum by the RIAA.

"Wasted" also proved another successful hit for Underwood by peaking at number one for three consecutive weeks on the Hot Country Songs chart, and going to number 37 on the Hot 100. The song has sold 705,000 copies in the United States and has been certified Platinum in August 2015.

Dann Huff produced tracks 3, 6, 8, 9, 11, and 12, Desmond Child produced "Inside Your Heaven", and Mark Bright produced the rest.

Promotion
To promote Some Hearts, Underwood embarked on her very first solo tour, which was called Carrie Underwood: Live 2006. The tour started April 4, 2006 and ended November 30 of the same year.

Critical reception

The album received positive reviews from music critics. Penny Rondinella of About.com gave a positive review to the album, awarding it with a four-and-a-half stars out of five and said: "American Idol Season 4 winner Carrie Underwood's debut album is just as expected, a country feel with some pop added to it. Lots of variety in her vocals, which tells me she has true talent." AllMusic gave it 4 out of 5 stars and classified the album as "anthemic country pop, ideal for either country or adult contemporary radio, with none of the delightful tackiness of Shania Twain—and her debut album, Some Hearts, not only hits this mark exactly, it's better than either album Hill has released since Breathe in 1999." It also praised Underwood's vocal performance and found that "she sounds equally convincing on such sentimental fare as 'Jesus, Take the Wheel' as on the soaring pop 'Some Hearts,' and even if she doesn't exactly sound tough on the strutting 'Before He Cheats,' she does growl with a fair amount of passion."

Some Hearts won Album of the Year at the 2007 Academy of Country Music Awards, while "Jesus, Take the Wheel" and "Before He Cheats" both won Single of the Year at the 2006 Academy of Country Music Awards and 2007 Country Music Association Awards, respectively. At the 49th Grammy Awards, in 2007, Underwood won the Grammy Award for Best New Artist and the Grammy Award for Best Female Country Vocal Performance, for "Jesus, Take the Wheel", which also won Best Country Song for its songwriters, being nominated for Song of the Year as well. The following year, at the 50th Grammy Awards, Underwood won the Grammy for Best Female Country Vocal Performance for "Before He Cheats". The song won Best Country Song for the songwriters as well as being nominated for Song of the Year.

Awards and nominations

Commercial performance
Some Hearts debuted at number two on the Billboard 200, behind Madonna's Confessions on a Dance Floor and number one on the Billboard Top Country Albums selling 315,000 copies in its first week. The large first week sales of Some Hearts made it the biggest debut of any country artist since the advent of the SoundScan system in 1991. It was also the fifth best first-week sales for any American Idol contestant (behind Ruben Studdard's Soulful, her own Play On and Carnival Ride, and Clay Aiken's Measure of a Man, which sold over 417,000 copies, 318,000 copies, 527,000 copies and 613,000 copies, respectively, in their first weeks). In the week of December 25, 2006, the album's fifty-eighth week on the chart, the album rose back up to number four on the Billboard 200 chart after selling close to 300,000 copies.

Some Hearts became the best-selling album of 2006 in all genres in the United States. The album was also the best-selling country album in the United States of both 2006 and 2007, making Underwood the first female artist in Billboard history to earn back-to-back honors for Top Country Album. Additionally, it was the best-selling female country album of 2005, 2006 and 2007.

On the U.S. Billboard 200, the album had a run of 137 consecutive weeks on the chart, the second-longest for any album released in 2005, behind Nickelback's All the Right Reasons, making it the sixth album with the most weeks spent on such a chart since 2000. The album spent 10 weeks within the Top 5 of the Billboard 200, a record among American Idol alumni. On the week dated December 12, 2009, under the changes of Billboard'''s rules, the album re-entered the Billboard 200, at number 132.
The album appeared on the Billboard Year-End Chart for 2009, coming in at number 158 for album sales that year. On the week dated for August 7, 2010, the album climbed back onto the Billboard 200, reaching No. 191.  On the week dated for December 5, 2010, the album once again landed onto the Billboard 200, reaching No. 192.  On the week dated for December 8, 2012, the album once again landed onto the Billboard 200, reaching No. 69.Some Hearts has since been certified nine times Platinum by the RIAA, and is the fastest-selling debut country album in the history of the SoundScan era, the best-selling solo female debut album in country music history, the best-selling Country album of the last 10 years, and the best-selling album by an American Idol alumni in the U.S. As of December 2015, it has sold over 7,450,000 copies in the United States. On October 24, 2016, the album was certified 8× Platinum by the RIAA.

By December 2007, Some Hearts had sold over 7 million copies worldwide, according to Forbes. Worldwide sales stand at 10 million copies.

In December 2009, Billboard announced that the album was the biggest-selling country album of the 2000s decade, as well as the fourteenth biggest-selling album of any genre.
On August 6, 2016 issue of Billboard, Some Hearts reached No. 7 on the All-time Country Albums chart. On All-time Country Songs'' chart, the album's fourth single, "Before He Cheats", reached No. 64.

In October 2021, the album was certified nine times Platinum, with the single "Before He Cheats" certified seven times Platinum.

Track listing

Personnel
As listed in liner notes.

 Tom Bukovac – electric guitar
 Jim Van Cleve – fiddle
 Lisa Cochran – background vocals
 Perry Coleman – background vocals
 Randy Cantor – acoustic guitar, electric guitar, bass guitar, lap steel guitar, keyboards, programming, recording
 J. T. Corenflos – electric guitar
 Gretchen Peters – strings, writer
 Jeanette Olsson – background vocals
 Stephen Crook – recording
 Eric Darken – percussion
 Shannon Forrest – drums
 Paul Franklin – steel guitar
 Morgane Hayes – background vocals
 Wes Hightower – background vocals
 Mark Hill – bass guitar
 Dann Huff – electric guitar
 Tim Roberts – drums, assistant mix engineer
 John Hanes – piano, additional Pro Tools engineers
 Mike Johnson – steel guitar
 Charlie Judge – keyboards, programming 
 Hillary Lindsey – background vocals
 Chris McHugh – drums
 Gary Morse – steel guitar
 Jacob Miller – additional vocal production
 Carlos Alvarez – mixing
 Bryan Golder – recording
 Mikal Blue – recording
 Stephen Crook – recording
 Clarita Sanchaz – assistant mix engineer
 Serban Ghenea – mixing
 Steve Nathan – keyboards
 Matt Rollings – piano
 Jimmie Lee Sloas – bass guitar
 Adam Steffey – mandolin
 Bryan Sutton – acoustic guitar
 Neil Thrasher – background vocals
 Carrie Underwood – lead vocals, background vocals
 Biff Watson – acoustic guitar
 Lonnie Wilson – drums
 Jonathan Yudkin – fiddle, dobro, mandolin, banjo, violin, viola, cello, arco bass, octofone

 All strings on "Jesus, Take the Wheel" performed and arranged by Jonathan Yudkin.
 String section on "Lessons Learned" and "Starts with Goodbye":
 Arranged and conducted by Paul Buckmaster
 Violins – Cani, Susan Chatman, Joel Derouin, Endre Granat, Julian Hallmark, Mario de Leon, Michael Markman, Sid Page, Alyssa Park, Michele Richards, Teresa Stanisla, Josefina Vergara
 Violas – Denyse Buffum, Andrew Duckles, Matt Funes, Shanti Randall
 Cellos – Larry Corbett, Suzie Katayama, Steve Richards, Daniel Smith

Charts

Weekly charts

Year-end charts

Singles

 A "Before He Cheats" charted for twenty weeks on the U.S. Hot Country Songs chart before being confirmed as a single.

Certifications

Release history

References

2005 debut albums
Arista Records albums
Carrie Underwood albums
Albums produced by Dann Huff
Albums produced by Desmond Child
Albums produced by Mark Bright (record producer)
19 Recordings albums
Arista Nashville albums